Douglas Doerr Kincaid (born 1962) is an American artist, writer, and performer, best known for his work in the fields of puppetry and promotional costuming (mascot costumes).

Early influences, education, and career 

From an early age, Kincaid was interested in the creation, depiction, and performance of imaginary characters and settings, especially in the fields of motion pictures, television, and theme parks. He lists as major artistic influences Walt Disney, renowned puppeteers & producers Sid and Marty Krofft, animation legend Chuck Jones, acclaimed writer and Twilight Zone creator Rod Serling, pioneering character make-up artists Lon Chaney and Dick Smith, veteran character actor Felix Silla, and British comedy icons Monty Python and Benny Hill. 

In 1977, at the age of 15, he co-founded- with brother William Kincaid- The Kincaid Karacter Company, which would become one of the best known national producers of professional mascot costumes, helping to develop and manufacture such iconic American mascots as "BUD MAN" and "Spuds Mackenzie" for Anheuser-Busch (AB-InBev), "Fredbird" for the St. Louis Cardinals, the "Billiken" for Saint Louis University, "Elroy Elk", the national mascot of the Benevolent and Protective Order of Elks (Elks Lodges),  and "Homer", the handyman mascot of home improvement giant The Home Depot. 

From 1978 to 1981, Kincaid and his brother Bill worked with the Six Flags Theme Park in St. Louis, Missouri, creating and portraying costumed characters, performing in the puppet theater, and designing characters and sets for the Six Flags haunted attractions, as well as creating costumes & props for Six Flags television commercials. While attending Washington University in St. Louis in 1980, Kincaid began a 19-year relationship with CBS affiliate KMOX (later KMOV-TV), performing, writing, and creating sets, puppets, and characters (again with brother Bill) for two Emmy Award-winning children's programs, D. B.'s Delight (1977–1988) and Gator Tales (1988–1999). In 1989, Bill left The Kincaid Karacter Company to pursue other interests, but has continued to contribute to the company throughout the years as a creative consultant.

In early 1990, Kincaid passed an audition with The Muppets, and trained with them during the summer of 1990 at Disney's Hollywood Studios in Orlando in preparation for a planned series of television specials to be produced there. The untimely passing of Muppet founder Jim Henson in May of that year resulted in these plans being shelved, however.

During the summer of 1993, Kincaid was a featured performer/puppeteer on Ranger Bob's Buckaroo Club, a children's television show produced by WKCF TV 18 in Orlando.

Recent projects 

In addition to year-round touring and performing as a professional puppeteer, Kincaid continues to design and create mascot characters, puppets, sets, props, displays, and touring shows for a wide variety of organizations and applications, including corporations, professional sports teams, and theme parks. Recently, he is active in the development of The Kincaid Karacter Studios, a multifaceted production services company located in Atlanta, GA.

References 

 St. Louis Post Dispatch, January 7, 1983 "Almost Live! Dodo is rare bird indeed" biographical article on Bill & Doug Kincaid
 St. Louis Globe-Democrat, Friday, July 5, 1985, Living Section Front Page, "Talented brothers are creators...", article on Bill and Doug Kincaid.
 St. Louis Post Dispatch, Monday March 20, 1989, "Kids Learning Responsibility With "Gator" Aid", article on Bill & Doug Kincaid and "Gator Tales" television show.
 St. Louis Business Journal, September 12, 1988, "Those Guy's at Kincaid are really Characters", article on The Kincaid Karacter Company
 St. Louis Sun TV Magazine, October 28, 1989, "Gator Aid", article on "Gator Tales" and Doug Kincaid
 St. Louis Post-Dispatch, March 7, 2006, "They Don't Come Much Bigger", article on Felix Silla & Doug Kincaid
 Inc._(magazine), September 10, 2018, "Meet the Company Behind Thousands of America's Favorite Mascots"- article on William Kincaid, Doug Kincaid, and The Kincaid Karacter Company

External links 

 http://www.kincaidkaracters.com The Official Website of The Kincaid Karacter Company
 http://www.kincaidpuppets.com The Official Website of The Kincaid Karacter Puppets

1962 births
Living people
American puppeteers
Artists from St. Louis
Washington University in St. Louis alumni